The Lontué River is a river in the province of Curicó in Chile. It  originates about 50 km east of Curicó, at the confluence of the Colorado River and the Los Patos River.  Both rivers have their origin next to the  volcanos Descabezado Chico and Descabezado Grande.  The Lontué River forms the Mataquito River at the union with the Teno River that runs to the north, about 10 kilometers west of Curicó near the locality of Sagrada Familia.

Sources 
 Cuenca del río Mataquito

Rivers of Chile
Rivers of Maule Region